Qu Yun may refer to:

Qu Yun (Jin dynasty) (died 316), military general of the Jin dynasty
Qu Yun (swimmer) (born 1978), Chinese butterfly stroke swimmer and coach